For the Kingdom is an EP by the rock band Unisonic. It was released in 2014 on EarMusic Edel AG. The album contains one future album track, an exclusive song, and four live tracks recorded during the band's Masters Of Rock Festival performance in 2012. The cover art is credited to Martin Häusler.

Track listing

Personnel
 Michael Kiske – Vocals
 Kai Hansen – Guitars, backing vocals
 Mandy Meyer – Guitars
 Dennis Ward – Bass guitar, backing vocals
 Kosta Zafiriou – Drums
'Guest Session Musician
Günter Werno – Keyboard on tracks 1 & 2

Additional Personnel
 Mixed by Dennis Ward
 Mastered by Jürgen Lusky (tracks 1 & 2)
 Recorded by Dennis Ward (tracks 1 & 2)
 Artwork and Design by Martin Häusler

References

External links
 Unisonic official website
 EarMusic official website

2014 EPs
Albums produced by Dennis Ward (musician)